José Clemente Pérez Errázuriz (born 7 September 1967) is a Chilean politician and lawyer.

External links
Fulbright Scholarship Profile

Living people
1967 births
20th-century Chilean lawyers
Pontifical Catholic University of Chile alumni
Christian Democratic Party (Chile) politicians